Nadigudiketra is a village in Belgaum district of Karnataka, India. As of 2011, the population was 534.

References

Villages in Belagavi district